William Stephen Oleschuk (born July 20, 1955) is a Canadian former professional ice hockey goaltender who played for the Kansas City Scouts and Colorado Rockies in the National Hockey League between 1975 and 1979. He played 55 games in the NHL, finishing with a 7–28–10 record and one shutout. The rest of his career, which lasted from 1975 to 1984, was spent in various minor leagues.

Career statistics

Regular season and playoffs

References

External links

1955 births
Living people
Baltimore Clippers (SHL) players
Canadian expatriate ice hockey players in the United States
Canadian ice hockey goaltenders
Colorado Rockies (NHL) players
Dallas Black Hawks players
Flint Generals players
Fort Wayne Komets players
Fort Worth Texans players
Hampton Gulls (AHL) players
Houston Aeros draft picks
Kansas City Scouts draft picks
Kansas City Scouts players
Lethbridge Broncos players
Oklahoma City Blazers (1965–1977) players
Peoria Prancers players
Philadelphia Firebirds (AHL) players
Phoenix Roadrunners (CHL) players
Port Huron Flags players
Saskatoon Blades players
Ice hockey people from Edmonton
Swift Current Broncos players
Winnipeg Jets (WHL) players